Arvingen is a 1954 Danish family film directed by Jon Iversen and Alice O'Fredericks.

Cast
Poul Reichhardt as Underforvalter Anders Jansen
Astrid Villaume as Lise Bruun
Nina Pens Rode as Else von Kipping
William Rosenberg as Forvalter Ingolf Petersen
Paul Hagen as Mads Olsen
Karl Stegger as Skibsofficer
Otto Møller Jensen as Jens
Gunnar Lauring as Klaus Borch
Ib Schønberg as Godsforvalter Henriksen
Jon Iversen as Landlæge Blom
Ingeborg Skov as Charlotte von Kipping
Arne-Ole David as Gerhard von Kipping
Ingolf David as Magnus von Kipping
Marie Brink as Oline
Julie Grønlund as Hanne
Agnes Phister-Andresen as Fru Holst
Knud Hallest as Kaptajn
Asta Esper Hagen Andersen as Fru Bruun (as Asta Esper Hagen)
Carl Johan Hviid as Gårdejer Bruun

External links

1954 films
1954 drama films
1950s Danish-language films
Danish black-and-white films
Films directed by Alice O'Fredericks
Films scored by Sven Gyldmark
Films directed by Jon Iversen
Danish drama films